Bamba Thialène is the name of a settlement (and the local district (communauté rurale) and arrondissement named after it) in the department of Koumpentoum in Tambacounda Region of east Senegal.

External links
PEPAM

Populated places in Tambacounda Region